Raheen is a small village south of Portlaoise in County Laois, Ireland.

History
The Gothic revival Roman Catholic parish church of Raheen is dedicated to St. Fintan and dates from 1857. The first Catholic church, a thatched chapel, was built in 1729 on a site granted by a Protestant family named Baldwin. Mr. Baldwin granted the land after seeing poor Catholics assembled at Mass in a deep pit, which is called the Mass Pit even to the present time.

The graveyard in the village marks the site of the old thatched chapel.

Education 
There is one primary school, Tobar an Léinn, located in the area.

Sport
St. Fintans, Colt GAA is the local Gaelic football and hurling club. Raheen F.C is a local association football (soccer) club.

Gallery

See also
List of towns and villages in Ireland

References

Towns and villages in County Laois
Townlands of County Laois